Stojanovski is a Macedonian surname that literally means "son of Stojan", famous people with the surname include:
Aleksandar Stojanovski (born 1983), Macedonian footballer
Aleksandar Stojanovski (alpine skier) (born 1979), Macedonian alpine skier
Damjan Stojanovski (born 1987), Macedonian basketballer
Filip Stojanovski (born 1996), Macedonian footballer
Luka Stojanovski (born 2000), Macedonian basketballer
Ognen Stojanovski (born 1984), Macedonian basketballer
Milan Stojanovski (born 1973), Macedonian football manager and former player
Miroslav Stojanovski (born 1959), Macedonian military officer
Vlatko Stojanovski (born 1997), Macedonian footballer
Vojdan Stojanovski (born 1987), Macedonian basketballer

See also
Stojanov

Surnames
Macedonian-language surnames